The 2013 CONCACAF U-17 Championship was a North American international association football tournament that determined the 2013 FIFA U-17 World Cup participants from the CONCACAF region. The 2013 edition of the competition was held in Panama.

Qualified teams

Three teams will qualify through the Central American qualifying tournament and five will qualify through the Caribbean qualifying tournament. Hosts Panama automatically qualify.

Venues

Squads

Group stage
Tiebreakers
a. Greater number of Points in matches between the tied teams.
b. Greater Goal Difference in matches between the tied teams (if more than two teams finish equal on points).
c. Greater number of goals scored in matches among the tied teams (if more than two teams finish equal on points).
d. Greater Goal difference in all group matches.
e. Greater number of goals scored in all group matches.
f. Drawing of lots.

All times are local time

Group A

Group B

Group C

Group D

Knockout stage

All times are local time

Quarter-finals

Semi-finals

Third place match

Final

Winners

Player awards
Golden Boot
 Marco Granados
Most Valuable Player of the Tournament
 José Francisco Almanza
Golden Glove
 Raúl Gudiño
Fair Play
 Mexico

Countries to participate in 2013 FIFA U-17 World Cup
The 4 teams which qualified for the 2013 FIFA U-17 World Cup.

Goalscorers

 4 goals

  Marco Granados

3 goals

  Jordan Hamilton
  Jomar Diaz
  Ervin Zorrilla

 2 goals

  Yorjandy Samonte
  Christopher Alegría
  Devron García
  Jorge Bodden
  Hanson Boakai
  Andrew Gordon
  Christopher Ortiz
  Luis Enrique Hernández
  Ulises Jaimes
  Salomón Wbias
  Junior Flemmings
  Khalil Stewart
  Jesús Araya
  Andre Fortune
  Christopher Lema

 1 goals

  Shakille Belle
  Shaquille Boyce
  Marco Dominguez
  Jordan Haynes
  Marco Bustos
  Arington Alexander
  Mario Hernández
  Jean Derival
  Kevin Álvarez
  Alberth Elis
  Rembrandt Flores
  Brayan Velásquez
  Steven Ramos
  Raffique Bryan
  Alejandro Díaz
  Víctor Zúñiga
  Pedro Terán
  Milciades Molina
  Luis Zuñiga
  Weah Adams
  Brent Sam
  Corey Baird
  Ahinga Selemani
  Joel Soñora

Own goals
 Jaime De Gracia (playing against Mexico)

References

External links
 CONCACAF.com – Official website

 
2013
Under
2013
CON
2013 in youth association football